Man Up was a professional wrestling pay-per-view (PPV) event promoted by Ring of Honor (ROH). It took place on September 15, 2007 at the Frontier Fieldhouse in Chicago Ridge, Illinois, the site of the second PPV taping Driven, and first aired on November 30. The show takes its name from the popular catchphrase "Time To Man Up" of the Briscoe Brothers who are featured in the main event of the show. This PPV also marked the first appearance of Jimmy Jacob's new stable The Age of the Fall. The Wrestling Observer Newsletter named this the best overall show of 2007.

Results

See also
2007 in professional wrestling
List of Ring of Honor pay-per-view events

References

External links
Official site for the PPV

Man Up, ROH
Professional wrestling in the Chicago metropolitan area
2000s in Chicago
2007 in Illinois
Events in Chicago
September 2007 events in the United States
2007 Ring of Honor pay-per-view events